Alveolitis may refer to:

 Fibrosing alveolitis
 Allergic alveolitis